Forli (1963–1988) was an Argentinian Thoroughbred racehorse and sire. He was unbeaten in his native country, winning the Argentinian Triple Crown and being named Horse of the Year in 1966. He was imported to the United States in 1967 and won two of his three races before he was retired from racing. He stood as a breeding stallion in Kentucky and had considerable success as a sire of winners: he had a long-term influence on racing through his daughter Special, an influential broodmare. Forli died in 1988.

Background
Forli was a chestnut horse bred in Argentina by the Haras Ojo de Agua. He was sired by Aristophanes, a British stallion imported to Argentina after having shown good, but unexceptional form in his native country. He made a great impact as a breeding stallion and was the Leading sire in Argentina in 1960. Forli's dam Trevisa was a successful broodmare and a half sister to La Dogana, whose descendants included Crow. Forli was first raced in the ownership of Jorge Azevedo and was trained in Argentina by Juan Lapistoy.

Racing career
Forli was unbeaten in three races as a juvenile. As a three-year-old Forli won the Argentinian Triple Crown, winning the Gran Premio Polla De Potrillos, Gran Premio Jockey Club, and Gran Premio Nacional. When matched against older horse he won Argentina's premier weight-for-age, the Gran Premio Carlos Pellegrini. He ended his South American career unbeaten in seven starts.

In 1967 Forli was bought by Arthur B. Hancock, Jr. of Claiborne Farm for $60,000, and was transferred to the United States where he was trained by Charles E. Whittingham. He won on his North American debut setting a track record of 1:41.2 when winning the Coronado Handicap over eight and a half furlongs at Hollywood Park Racetrack in May. Forli then developed leg problems and was pinfired before returning to win an exhibition race at Hollywood in July. He suffered his first and only defeat in the Citation Handicap at Arlington Park when he finished second to Dominar.

Stud record
Forli was retired from racing to become a breeding stallion at Claiborne. He died in 1988 and was buried at Claiborne Farm. His notable progeny included:

1969 Special, dam of Nureyev and the grandam of Sadler's Wells
1970 Tuerta, dam of Swale
1970 Thatch, won St. James's Palace Stakes, July Cup Sussex Stakes
1970 Forego, three-time American Horse of the Year
1971 Lisadell, won Coronation Stakes
1972 Forceten, won Swaps Stakes
1972 Excellently, dam of Precisionist
1975 Fordham, won Joe McGrath Memorial Stakes
1983 Asteroid Field, won Matriarch Stakes
1983 Sadeem, won Ascot Gold Cup

Pedigree

References 

1963 racehorse births
1988 racehorse deaths
Racehorses bred in Argentina
Racehorses trained in Argentina
Racehorses trained in the United States
Horse racing track record setters
Thoroughbred family 3-b